Shooting is an event at the Island Games, the biennial multi-sports event for island nations, territories and dependencies.

Shooting at the Island Games has had Men, Women and Open events since the games started in 1985.

Host Island should endeavour to put on a Programme of Events (to a maximum of 10 Events to include a maximum of 3 Events specifically for Ladies) from the following:-
 ISSF - Olympic Skeet - requires 8 firing stations and 2 towers
 ISSF - Automatic Ball Trap - requires 1 house with a single trap machine
 ISSF - Double Trap - requires 1 house with 3 trap machines
 ISSF - Olympic Trap	- requires a bank of 15 trap machines
 FITASC - Universal Trench - requires a bank of 5 trap machines
 FITASC - Sporting Clay - Format to be agreed by Host Island and Technical Committee

IGR Island Games Record
NGR New Games Record

Events
As of 2019.

Top Medalists

Clay Target

Clay Top Medalists

Trap

Automatic Ball Trap

Skeet

Top Medalists

Results

Sporting

Universal Trench

Fullbore

Fullbore Top Medalists

Fullbore Queens

Centre Fire Rifle 300m ISSF

Smallbore

Smallbore Top Medalists

Air Rifle 10m ISSF

Top Medalists

Results

Smallbore Prone 50m ISSF

Top Medalists

Results

Smallbore 3 Position 50m ISSF

NSRA Rifle Prone 100 yards

Pistol

Pistol Top Medalists

Air Pistol 10m ISSF

Top Medalists

Results

Standard Pistol 25m ISSF

Top Medalists

Results

Sport Pistol 25m ISSF

Top Medalists

Results

Centrefire 25m ISSF

Top Medalists

Results

Rapidfire 25m ISSF

Free Pistol 50m ISSF

Top Medalists

Results

Practical Target IPSC

Centrefire 25m non ISSF CISM

Police Pistol

Top Medalists

Results

Service Pistol B

Standard Division IPSC

Open Division IPSC

1500 PPC

Black Powder

Top Medalists

Results

References

 
Sports at the Island Games
Island Games